Commemorative coins of Costa Rica have been designed by the Central Bank of Costa Rica to celebrate special events. The following is a complete list of all commemorative coins issued by the BCCR.

Table of contents

See also

Economy of Costa Rica
Commemorative banknotes of Costa Rica

Notes

References

External links
 The Museum of the Central Bank of Costa Rica

Lists of commemorative coins
Costa Rica